Caenorhabditis sp. 35 is a yet unnamed species of nematodes in the genus Caenorhabditis. Two isolates were discovered in 2013 by N. Kanzaki from Banda Aceh, Indonesia, associated with Ficus hispida.

Genetic studies show that it is basal in the 'Elegans' supergroup with C. inopinata.

References

External links 
 List of Caenorhabditis species (including Caenorhabditis sp. 35) at wormbase.org

sp. 35
Undescribed animal species
Fauna of Indonesia
Fauna of Sumatra
Banda Aceh